Kim Geon-ung (a.k.a. Kim Keon-woong; ; born 29 August 1997) is a South Korean football midfielder who plays for Jeonbuk Hyundai Motors and the South Korea national under-23 football team.

Club career 
Kim joined Ulsan Hyundai in 2016. On 1 May 2016, Kim made his senior team debut in K League Classic against Incheon United at Incheon Football Stadium, replacing Seo Jung-jin at the 79th minute by the coach Yoon Jong-hwan. On 13 July 2016, he scored his first goal for senior team against Incheon United in 2016 Korean FA Cup quarter-final match at the 15th minute. Ulsan won the game by 4–1.

International career 
Kim was a member of the South Korea U-20 national team from 2015 to 2016. He won the gold medal with the South Korea U-23 national team at the 2018 Asian Games.

Career statistics

Club

References

External links 
 

1997 births
Living people
Association football midfielders
South Korean footballers
Ulsan Hyundai FC players
Jeonnam Dragons players
K League 1 players
K League 2 players
Footballers at the 2018 Asian Games
Asian Games medalists in football
Asian Games gold medalists for South Korea
Medalists at the 2018 Asian Games
South Korea under-20 international footballers
South Korea under-23 international footballers